André Eugène Fouché (17 September 1908 – 23 July 2001) was a French actor.

Fouché was born in Paris and died in Poissy, Yvelines, Île-de-France.

Filmography

Bibliography
 Oscherwitz,Dayna & Higgins, MaryEllen. The A to Z of French Cinema. Scarecrow Press, 2009.

External links

1908 births
2001 deaths
French male film actors
Male actors from Paris